Richard Neil Lyons (born January 22, 1945 in New York City, New York) is an American mathematician, specializing in finite group theory.

Lyons received his PhD in 1970 at the University of Chicago under John Griggs Thompson with a thesis entitled Characterizations of Some Finite Simple Groups with Small 2-Rank. From 1972 to 2017, he was a professor at Rutgers University.

With Daniel Gorenstein and Ronald Solomon he wrote, and is continuing to write, a series on the classification program for finite simple groups, a program in which the three of them were major participants. Nine volumes of this series have been published so far. He discovered a sporadic group which Charles Sims constructed and called the Lyons group Ly.

In 2012, he shared the Leroy P. Steele Prize for Mathematical Exposition, awarded by the American Mathematical Society, with Michael Aschbacher, Stephen D. Smith, and Ronald Solomon.
In 2013, he became a fellow of the American Mathematical Society "for contributions to the classification of the finite simple groups, including the discovery of one of the 26 sporadic finite simple groups.".

Works 
 with Gorenstein: The local structure of finite groups of characteristic 2 type, American Mathematical Society, 1983
 with Daniel Gorenstein, Ronald Solomon: The classification of the finite simple groups, American Mathematical Society, 9 Vols., 1994–2021
 with Michael Aschbacher, Stephen D. Smith, Ronald Solomon: The classification of finite simple groups: Groups of characteristic 2 type, American Mathematical Society, 2011

References

External links 
 Homepage

20th-century American mathematicians
21st-century American mathematicians
1945 births
Group theorists
University of Chicago alumni
Rutgers University faculty
Living people
Fellows of the American Mathematical Society